Dark Streets is a lost 1929 American pre-Code crime film directed by Frank Lloyd and starring Jack Mulhall and Lila Lee. The film was produced and distributed by First National Pictures. Mulhall purportedly plays the first dual role attempted in talking pictures.

Cast
Jack Mulhall as Pat McGlone / Danny McGlone
Lila Lee as Katie Dean
Aggie Herring as Mrs. Dean
Earl Pingree as Cuneo
Will Walling as Police Captain
E. H. Calvert as Police Lieutenant
Maurice Black as Beefy Barker
Lucien Littlefield as Census taker
Pat Harmon as Hoodlum

References

External links

1929 films
Lost American films
Films directed by Frank Lloyd
First National Pictures films
American crime films
1929 crime films
American black-and-white films
1929 lost films
1920s American films